Česká Kamenice is a town in Ústí nad Labem Region of the Czech Republic. It has about 5,000 inhabitants. The town centre is well preserved and is protected by law as an urban monument zone.

Administrative parts
Villages of Dolní Kamenice, Filipov, Horní Kamenice, Huníkov, Kamenická Nová Víska, Kerhartice, Líska, Pekelský Důl and Víska pod Lesy are administrative parts of Česká Kamenice.

Geography

The municipal territory is hilly and extends into three geomorphological regions: Lusatian Mountains, Central Bohemian Uplands and Elbe Sandstone Mountains.

The river Kamenice and several brooks flow through Česká Kamenice.

History
The first written mention of Česká Kamenice is from 1352. The town was founded at the crossroads of two paths, the so-called "Bohemian Road" and the "Lusatian Road", probably in the area of an older Slavic settlement. It was founded before 1283, probably in the 1270s during the reign of King Ottokar II, when the colonization of the region culminates mainly in settlers from neighbouring Saxony.

Concentration camp
In spring 1944, the Rabstein sub-camp of Flossenbürg concentration camp was created here, with a capacity of 600 prisoners. At the end of the war, 1,500 inmates were incarcerated in the camp. The camp provided workers for the nearby underground aircraft factory in the town of Janská, 3 km west of Česká Kamenice. The number of inmate deaths is not known due to the destruction of all camp documentation. The foundations of the camp buildings remain visible, along with a memorial and historical overview.

Demographics

Sights

Míru Square and its surroundings form the historic town centre. The stone renaissance fountain on the square is from 1574. The main landmarks of the centre are Church of Saint James the Great, Evangelical church, Pilgrimage Chapel of the Nativity of the Virgin Mary, Kamenice Chateau and Salhausen Chateau. There are many preserved houses in Neoclassical and Art Nouveau styles.

Due to the natural conditions, there are several rocky lookouts in the area. On Studenec, there is an iron observation tower from 1888, a technical monument. A ruin of Česká Kamenice Castle is preserved on the Zámecký hill, in its premises there is a wooden observation tower.

The remains of the concentration camp and the underground aircraft factory contains an exposition and under certain conditions are open to the public.

Notable people
Joseph Rothe (1759–1808), operatic singer
Johann Baptist Emanuel Pohl (1782–1834), botanist, entomologist, geologist and physician
Hannes Hegen (1925–2014), illustrator and caricaturist

Antonín Dvořák took further organ and music-theory lessons at Česká Kamenice with Franz Hanke.

Twin towns – sister cities

Česká Kamenice is twinned with:
 Bad Schandau, Germany

Gallery

References

External links

 (in Czech)
Microregion Českokamenicko (in Czech)
Historical postcards of Česká Kamenice
Virtual show

Cities and towns in the Czech Republic
Populated places in Děčín District